The sixth series of Dancing on Ice aired from 9 January to 27 March 2011 on ITV. Phillip Schofield and Holly Willoughby returned as hosts whilst Jayne Torvill and Christopher Dean returned to mentor the celebrities. As part of a major revamp, the show moved from Elstree Studios to Shepperton Studios, and unveiled a new set. It was the also the first series to be broadcast in HD.

Karen Barber, Jason Gardiner, Robin Cousins and Emma Bunton returned, though Barber moved from the "Ice Panel" to the role of head coach. Nicky Slater did not return as a judge and was not replaced. In another change, the judges gave scores out of 10.0 instead of 6.0, giving an overall total out of 30.0.

The line-up was revealed on 18 December 2010 and consisted of sixteen celebrities. The first two shows, on 9 and 16 January 2011, were billed as "qualifying" shows, with eight couples skating in each, and two being eliminated. The remaining twelve couples progressed to the main competition, which started on 23 January.

A twist on 30 January saw the two celebrities with the lowest combined total of judges' scores and public votes compete in the skate-off as usual, but their fellow celebrities deciding which of them would stay in the competition instead of the judges.

On 6 March, the six remaining celebrities took part in the first ever team challenge. Following their standard performances, they were divided into two groups of three, with each group performing their own routine. The judges then decided which performance was best, with every celebrity in the winning team having their previous scores doubled. Two weeks later, on 20 March, the four remaining celebrities performed a solo routine following their standard performances.

The final, on 27 March, was the first not to feature flying performances. Instead, the three remaining couples performed their own "showcase" routines, for which they were joined by four professional skaters. As before, one couple was eliminated, before the final two couples performed Bolero.

Former EastEnders actor Sam Attwater was crowned the celebrity winner, with Brianne Delcourt the professional winner.

Couples
Sixteen celebrities signed up to compete on the sixth season of Dancing on Ice. Four of the contestants were axed in the two opening shows before the competition began properly.

Scoring chart

Green scores indicate the highest skating score of the week.
Red scores indicate the lowest skating score of the week.
 indicates the couple eliminated that week
 indicates the returning couple that finished in the bottom two/three
 indicates the winning couple
 indicates the runner-up couple
 indicates the third-place couple
"—" indicates the couple that did not skate that week

Average score chart 
This table only counts for dances scored on a traditional 30 points scale (the doubled scores for the team challenge in week 7 are not included).

Live show details

Results summary
Colour key

 
 The judges did not vote to save any celebrities during the Qualifying rounds. Once the bottom 3 were revealed the lines were re-opened during the dance-off and the one celebrity with the highest vote was saved.
 Cousins did not need to vote as there was already a majority.
 Week 2 Dominic Cork was eliminated by majority vote made by the remaining celebrities.
 Bunton did not need to vote as there was already a majority.
 Gardiner did not need to vote as there was already a majority.

Qualifying 1 (9 January)
Note: Only eight couples skated this week, with six going through to qualify for the competition.

Qualifying 2 (16 January)
Special musical guest: Ellie Goulding—"Your Song"
Note: Only eight of the couples skated this week.

Week 1 (23 January)

Judges' votes to save
Gardiner: Dominic & Alexandra
Bunton: Dominic & Alexandra
Cousins: Did not vote but would have voted for Dominic & Alexandra

Week 2 (30 January)
In the skate-off their fellow skating stars decide who stays and who goes

Contestants' votes to save
Madeley: Jeff & Isabelle
Beharry: Dominic & Alexandra
Katona: Jeff & Isabelle
Vanilla Ice: Jeff & Isabelle
Hamilton: Jeff & Isabelle
Metcalfe: Jeff & Isabelle
Welch: Dominic & Alexandra
Attwater: Jeff & Isabelle
Comedy Dave: Dominic & Alexandra

Week 3 (6 February)
Required element: Step combination – Ultimate Skills Test
Theme: Las Vegas Night

Judges' votes to save
Gardiner: Vanilla Ice & Katie
Cousins: Vanilla Ice & Katie
Bunton: Vanilla Ice & Katie

Week 4 (13 February)
Required element: Jump – Ultimate Skills Test
Theme: A Night at the Theatre
Special musical guest: Rachel Tucker—"Defying Gravity" from Wicked

Judges' votes to save
Bunton: Kerry & Daniel
Cousins: Comedy Dave & Frankie
Gardiner: Kerry & Daniel

Week 5 (20 February)
Required element: Step combination, jump & spin – Ultimate Skills Test
Special musical guest: Rumer—"What the World Needs Now Is Love"

Judges' votes to save
Bunton: Jeff & Isabelle
Cousins: Jeff & Isabelle
Gardiner: Jeff & Isabelle

Week 6 (27 February)
 As Holly Willoughby fell ill this week, former contestant Coleen Nolan replaced her as host.
Theme: International dances

Judges' votes to save
Cousins: Laura & Colin
Bunton: Laura & Colin
Gardiner: Laura & Colin

Week 7 (6 March)
Theme: Team challenge – to have their individual scores doubled
 Team Sam: "I Don't Feel Like Dancin'"—Scissor Sisters
 Team Laura: "Rockin' All Over the World"—Status Quo
Special musical guest: Nicole Scherzinger—"Don't Hold Your Breath"

Judges' votes for Team challenge
Gardiner: Team Laura
Cousins: Team Sam
Bunton: Team Laura

Judges votes to save
Bunton: Johnson & Jodeyne
Cousins: Johnson & Jodeyne
Gardiner: Johnson & Jodeyne

Week 8 (13 March)
Required element: Skating with a prop
Special musical guest: The Overtones—"Why Do Fools Fall in Love" and "Gambling Man".
All of the songs skated to by the celebrities and their partners were performed by the musical guest.

Judges' votes to save
Cousins:  Sam & Brianne
Gardiner:  Sam & Brianne
Bunton:  Sam & Brianne

Week 9 (20 March)
 Required element: Solo challenge

Judges' votes to save
Cousins: Chloe & Michael
Gardiner: Chloe & Michael
Bunton: Chloe & Michael

Week 10: Final (27 March)
 Required Element: Each couple would perform a Showcase routine along with their favourite routine of the series. One couple would be eliminated and the final two couples would perform Bolero.

Injuries
Vanilla Ice was knocked unconscious after slipping on a lift and hitting his head on the ice. Jennifer Metcalfe cut her thigh with her own skate blade.

Ratings 
Viewing figures from BARB.

References

2011 British television seasons
Series 06